The Division of South Sydney was an Australian Electoral Division in the state of New South Wales. It was located in the south of the city of Sydney.

The Division was proclaimed in 1900, and was one of the original 75 divisions to be contested at the first Federal election. At the redistribution of 1 August 1934, it was abolished and replaced by the Division of Watson (1934–1969), in honour of Hon Chris Watson, the first Labor Prime Minister of Australia and South Sydney's second member.

Members

Election results

1901 establishments in Australia
Constituencies established in 1901
South Sydney